The governor, according to the Political Constitution of the Free and Sovereign State of Veracruz de Ignacio de la Llave in Mexico, the Executive Power is invested in one individual, called "Constitutional Governor of the Free and Sovereign State of Veracruz de Ignacio de la Llave". The current governor is Cuitláhuac García Jiménez, who assumed the position on December 1, 2018. He is a member of the National Regeneration Movement.

Term
Governors are elected to serve for 6 years and they can not hold the title under any circumstance ever again. The governor takes office on the first day of December of the same electoral year and ends on November 30 six years after.

The State of Veracruz was created on 1824, being one of the original States of the Federation, it has experienced all the political systems implemented in Mexico, federalism and centralism, thus it has changed its name from "State of" to "Department of" to "State of" again.

List of governors
The list with all the governors of the State since 1825 follows.

Nineteenth century

Free and Sovereign State of Veracruz

 (1825 - 1828): Miguel Barragán
 (1829 - 1829): Sebastián Camacho Castilla (First Term)
 (1829 - 1829): Antonio López de Santa Anna (First Term)
 (1829 - 1829): Sebastián Camacho Castilla (Second Term)
 (1829 - 1829): Antonio López de Santa Anna (Second Term)
 (1829 - 1830): Antonio López de Santa Anna (Third Term)
 (1833 - 1833): Antonio Juille y Moreno (First Term)
 (1833 - 1834): Antonio Juille y Moreno (Second Term)

Department of Veracruz
From 1834 to 1857 there are no popular-elected governors due to Santa Anna's centralist Seven Laws.

Free and Sovereign State of Veracruz

 (1857 - 1857): Manuel Gutiérrez Zamora (First Term)
 (1857 - 1857): José de Emparán (Interim Governor)
 (1857 - 1861): Manuel Gutiérrez Zamora (Second Term)
 (1861 - 1862): Ignacio de la Llave y Segura Zevallos

Veracruz in the Second Empire
From 1864 to 1867.

Free and Sovereign State of Veracruz-Llave

 (1867 - 1871): Francisco Hernández y Hernández (First Term)
 (1871 - 1872): Francisco Hernández y Hernández (Second Term)
 (1872 - 1875): Francisco Landero y Cos
 (1875 - 1876): José María Mena Isassi
 (1877 - 1880): Luis Mier y Terán
 (1880 - 1883): Apolinar Castillo
 (1883 - 1884): José Cortés Frías (Interim Governor)
 (1884 - 1888): Juan de la Luz Enríquez Lara (First Term)
 (1888 - 1892): Juan de la Luz Enríquez Lara (Second Term)
 (1892 - 1892): Manuel Leví (Interim Governor)
 (1892 - 1892): Leandro M. Alcolea Sierra (Interim Governor)
 (1892 - 1896): Teodoro A. Dehesa Méndez (First Term)
 (1896 - 1900): Teodoro A. Dehesa Méndez (Second Term)
 (1900 - 1904): Teodoro A. Dehesa Méndez (Third Term)

Twentieth century

 (1904 - 1908): Teodoro A. Dehesa Méndez (Fourth Term)
 (1908 - 1911): Teodoro A. Dehesa Méndez (Fifth Term)
 (1911 - 1911): Emilio Léycegui (Interim Governor)
 (1911 - 1911): León Aillaud (Interim Governor)
 (1911 - 1912): Manuel María Alegre (Interim Governor)
 (1912 - 1912): Francisco Lagos Cházaro Mortero
 (1912 - 1913): Antonio Pérez Rivera
 (1917 - 1917): Mauro Loyo Sánchez (Interim Governor)
 (1917 - 1920): Cándido Aguilar Vargas
 (1920 - 1924): Adalberto Tejeda Olivares (First Term)
 (1924 - 1927): Heriberto Jara Corona
 (1927 - 1928): Abel S. Rodríguez
 (1928 - 1932): Adalberto Tejeda Olivares (Second Term)
 (1932 - 1935): Gonzalo Vázquez Vela, National Revolutionary Party, PNR
 (1935 - 1936): Guillermo Rebolledo (Interim Governor), PNR
 (1936 - 1936): Ignacio Herrera Tejeda (Interim Governor), PNR
 (1936 - 1939): Miguel Alemán Valdés, PNR
 (1939 - 1940): Fernando Casas Alemán (Interim Governor) 
 (1940 - 1944): Jorge Cerdán Lara, Party of the Mexican Revolution, PRM 
 (1944 - 1948): Adolfo Ruíz Cortines, PRM
 (1948 - 1950): Ángel Carvajal Bernal (Interim Governor)
 (1950 - 1956): Marco Antonio Muñoz Turnbull 
 (1956 - 1962): Antonio María Quirasco 
 (1962 - 1968): Fernando López Arias 
 (1968 - 1974): Rafael Murillo Vidal 
 (1974 - 1980): Rafael Hernández Ochoa 
 (1980 - 1986): Agustín Acosta Lagunes 
 (1986 - 1988): Fernando Gutiérrez Barrios 
 (1988 - 1992): Dante Delgado Rannauro (Interim Governor) 
 (1992 - 1998): Patricio Chirinos Calero 
 (1998 - 2004): Miguel Alemán Velasco

Twenty-first century

Free and Sovereign State of Veracruz de Ignacio de la Llave
 (2004 - 2010): Fidel Herrera Beltrán 
 (2010 - 2016): Javier Duarte de Ochoa 
 Note: In October 2016, Duarte was declared a criminal by the Mexican government and was arrested in April 2017. The PRI issued an apology and expelled him from the political party.

 (October 12 - November 30, 2016): Flavino Ríos Alvarado (interim) 
 (2016 - 2018): Miguel Ángel Yunes Linares 
 (2018 - ): Cuitláhuac García Jiménez

See also
 List of Mexican state governors
 State of Veracruz

References

Lists of governors of States of Mexico
List